The Jewel in the Crown may refer to:

 The Jewel in the Crown (novel), a 1966 novel by Paul Scott
 The Jewel in the Crown (TV series), a 1984 television series based on the Paul Scott novel
 Jewel in the Crown (album), a 1995 album by Fairport Convention
 Jewels in the Crown: All-Star Duets with the Queen, a 2007 Aretha Franklin album
 India's nickname during the British Raj